Norihiro (written: 仙弘, 了洋, 紀寛, 紀洋, 乗寛, 範宏, 憲広, 教広, 教博, 典洋, 倫宏, 規広 or 謙宏) is a masculine Japanese given name. Notable people with the name include:

, Japanese baseball player
, Japanese baseball player
, Japanese actor and voice actor
, Japanese footballer
, Japanese daimyō
, Japanese baseball player
, Japanese footballer
, Japanese footballer
, Japanese violinist and composer
, Japanese manga writer and artist
, Japanese shogi player
, Japanese footballer
, Imperial Japanese Army officer

See also
29737 Norihiro, a main-belt asteroid

Japanese masculine given names